One Man Army may refer to:

 A one-man army, often a trope of action films, a heavily armed and well-trained combatant able to face numerous enemies alone

In music
One Man Army (band), an American punk rock band that formed in 1996 and dissolved in 2005
"One Man Army" (song), a 1999 single released by rock band Our Lady Peace
"One Man Army" (Kassidy album), 2012
"One Man Army" (Ensiferum album), 2015
One Man Army and the Undead Quartet, a Swedish death metal band that formed in 2004
OneManArmy, a hip hop M.C. also known as One Be Lo
Jezper Söderlund, known as "One Man Army", a Swedish record producer
The One Man Army, a 2005 album by Hardstyle DJ Radical Redemption

Other uses
One Man Army (TV series), a Discovery Channel television show
The One Man Army (1973 novel), by Moacyr Scliar
Arthur W. Wermuth, known as the One Man Army of Bataan for his actions against the Japanese in the Philippines
Johnny Seven OMA (One Man Army), a top selling 1964 toy gun
Minute-Man, a Fawcett Comics/DC Comics superhero described as a "one-man army"

See also
Army of One (disambiguation)